The women's 200 metres T11 event at the 2020 Summer Paralympics in Tokyo took place between 2 and 4 September 2021.

Records
Prior to the competition, the existing records were as follows:

Results

Heats
Heat 1 took place on 2 September 2021, at 10:02:

Heat 2 took place on 2 September 2021, at 10:10:

Heat 3 took place on 2 September 2021, at 10:18:

Heat 4 took place on 2 September 2021, at 10:26:

Semi-finals
Semi-final 1 took place on 3 September 2021, at 9:39:

Semi-final 2 took place on 3 September 2021, at 9:47:

Final
The final took place on 4 September, at 19:29:

References

Women's 200 metres T11
2021 in women's athletics